Harlem is a census-designated place (CDP) in Hendry County, Florida, United States.  It was established in 1931.

Geography
Harlem is located in northeastern Hendry County at  (26.735457, -80.951462). It is bordered to the north by the city of Clewiston.

Demographics

As of the census of 2000, there were 2,730 people, 877 households, and 644 families residing in the CDP. The racial makeup of the CDP was 95.38% African American, 2.31% White, 0.18% Native American, 0.11% Asian, 0.51% from other races, and 1.50% from two or more races. Hispanic or Latino of any race were 2.64% of the population.

There were 877 households, out of which 43.6% had children under the age of 18 living with them, 31.9% were [married couples living together, 35.1% had a female householder with no husband present, and 26.5% were non-families. 22.6% of all households were made up of individuals, and 7.6% had someone living alone who was 65 years of age or older. The average household size was 3.11 and the average family size was 3.67.

In the CDP, the population was spread out, with 39.5% under the age of 18, 10.0% from 18 to 24, 24.1% from 25 to 44, 18.1% from 45 to 64, and 8.3% who were 65 years of age or older. The median age was 25 years. For every 100 females, there were 88.5 males. For every 100 females age 18 and over, there were 78.0 males.

The median income for a household in the CDP was $21,232, and the median income for a family was $22,574. Males had a median income of $21,771 versus $20,156 for females. The per capita income for the CDP was $11,571. About 31.2% of families and 40.4% of the population were below the poverty line, including 58.6% of those under age 18 and 23.0% of those age 65 or over.

References

Census-designated places in Hendry County, Florida
Census-designated places in Florida